Salsa Ballers FC is an Anguillan football club based in George Hill that competes in the AFA Senior League, the top tier of Anguillan football.

In the 2010–11, the club finished in third place with 20 points.

References 

Football clubs in Anguilla
AFA Senior Male League clubs